is a Japanese voice actress. Prior to 1998, she was affiliated with Arts Vision and is currently freelancing. Some of her major roles in anime include the title character in New Cutie Honey, Jun the Swan in Gatchaman 94, Ritsuko Takahashi in Hell Teacher Nube, Melissa Mao in Full Metal Panic!, Riza Hawkeye in Fullmetal Alchemist, Vinsmoke Reiju in One Piece series and Doll Izumi in Super Doll Licca-chan.  In video games, she has voiced characters in many franchises, including Hsien-Ko/Lei-Lei in DarkStalkers, Mako Sato in Initial D, Sophitia in Soul Edge / Soulcalibur, Rose in Street Fighter Zero 3, Leona in Popolocrois, Natalia Luzu Kimlasca-Lanvaldear in Tales of the Abyss, Amy Burklight in Tales of Phantasia, Dai Heart & Tomoko in Sailor Moon S, Sailor Moon Super S, Chie Sagamiōno in You're Under Arrest, Erika Kawai in BOYS BE, Jun Tao in Shaman King and Shaman King 2021 & Abbey Windsor and Hilda Harken in Mobile Suite Gundam SEED DESTINY.

Filmography

Anime

Films

Video games

Audio dramas

Dubbing

References

External links
 Michiko Neya at Hitoshi Doi's seiyuu database
 

1965 births
Living people
Arts Vision voice actors
Japanese video game actresses
Japanese voice actresses
Voice actresses from Fukui Prefecture
20th-century Japanese actresses
21st-century Japanese actresses